Alireza Nasr Azadani (born September 21, 1985 in Isfahan, Iran) is an Iranian taekwondo practitioner. He won the gold medal in the lightweight division (-74 kg) at the 2011 World Taekwondo Championships in Gyeongju, South Korea.

References

External links
 

Iranian male taekwondo practitioners
1985 births
Living people
Asian Games gold medalists for Iran
Asian Games bronze medalists for Iran
Asian Games medalists in taekwondo
Taekwondo practitioners at the 2006 Asian Games
Taekwondo practitioners at the 2010 Asian Games
Medalists at the 2006 Asian Games
Medalists at the 2010 Asian Games
Universiade medalists in taekwondo
Sportspeople from Isfahan
Universiade gold medalists for Iran
Universiade silver medalists for Iran
World Taekwondo Championships medalists
Asian Taekwondo Championships medalists
Medalists at the 2007 Summer Universiade
Medalists at the 2009 Summer Universiade
20th-century Iranian people
21st-century Iranian people
Islamic Solidarity Games competitors for Iran